Germany–Nepal relations are the bilateral relations between Germany and Nepal.

In World War II, Nepal was one of the first countries to declare war on Germany, on 4 September 1939, the fourth day of the German invasion of Poland.

Germany–Nepal relations were officially established on 4 April 1958.

References

External links
 

 
Bilateral relations of Nepal
Nepal